The Sauer is a river in France (Alsace) and Germany (Rhineland-Palatinate). Its upper course, in Germany, is called Saarbach. Its source is in the Palatinate forest, near the French border, south of Pirmasens. It flows into France near Schœnau, and continues through Wœrth and north of Haguenau. It flows into the Rhine in Seltz, opposite the mouth of the Murg.

Tributaries 
 Seltzbach
 Soultzbach (Sauer)

References

Rivers of France
Rivers of Rhineland-Palatinate
South Palatinate
Rivers and lakes of the Palatinate Forest
Rivers of Grand Est
Rivers of Bas-Rhin
Rivers of Germany
International rivers of Europe